Leucosyrinx lancea is a species of sea snail, a marine gastropod mollusk in the family Pseudomelatomidae, the turrids and allies.

Description
The length of the shell attains 40 mm.

Distribution
This bathyal species occurs off the Pratas Island, South China Sea

References

 Lee Y.-C. 2001. Two new bathyal turrids (Gastropoda: Turridae) from West Pacific. Memoir, Malacological Society of Taiwan, 1: 7–9.

External links
 Gastropods.com: Leucosyrinx lancea

lancea
Gastropods described in 2001